Michael Lowther Kavanagh is a retired Church of England priest who was the Chaplain-General of Prisons (and Archdeacon of Prisons).

Early life and education
Kavanagh was educated at the University of York and the College of the Resurrection, Mirfield.

Ordained ministry
Kavanagh was ordained deacon in 1987 and priest in 1988. After curacies in Boston Spa and Clifford he was Vicar of Beverley from  1991 to 1997; serving additionally as its Rural Dean from 1995 to 1997. He was Domestic Chaplain to David Hope, Archbishop of York, from 1997 to 2005. He was a prison chaplain at Full Sutton from 2005 to 2008 and Anglican Advisor to the prison service before becoming its head in 2013. Kavanagh was formally licensed as Chaplain-General and Archdeacon for Prisons on 13 October 2014. He retired in 2018.

Personal life
Kavanagh married Linda Munt on 13 April 2013. She is also an Anglican priest.

References

1958 births
Alumni of the University of York
Alumni of the College of the Resurrection
Chaplains-General of Prisons
Living people
21st-century English Anglican priests